Father Voss (German:Vater Voss) is a 1925 German silent comedy film directed by Max Mack and starring Stewart Rome, Mary Odette and Lotte Stein. It was one of a number of popular comedies released by UFA alongside its more prestigious art films. In common with German practice at the time, two British stars were imported to add international appeal.

The film's art direction was by Robert A. Dietrich.

Cast
 Stewart Rome as William Voß 
 Mary Odette as Gerti 
 Lotte Stein as Mutter des William Voß 
 Robert Garrison as Prosecutor
 Rudolf Esk as Prokurist 
 Albert Paul as Senatspräsident 
 Hermann Picha as Zuverlässiger Herr 
 Arthur Pusey as Robert 
 Otto Reinwald as Bob 
 Berthold Rose as Blinder 
 F.W. Schröder-Schrom as Bankrier Holson 
 Franz Schönfeld as Untersuchungsrichter 
 Jenny Steiner as Frau von Welt 
 Aruth Wartan as Individuum

References

Bibliography
 Kreimeier, Klaus. The Ufa Story: A History of Germany's Greatest Film Company, 1918-1945. University of California Press, 1999.

External links

1925 films
1925 comedy films
Films of the Weimar Republic
German silent feature films
German comedy films
Films directed by Max Mack
UFA GmbH films
German black-and-white films
Silent comedy films
1920s German films
1920s German-language films